Vocheti is an abandoned village in the Kajaran Municipality in the Syunik Province of Armenia.

References 

Former populated places in Syunik Province